Kinondoni is one of five districts in Dar es Salaam, Tanzania, others being Temeke, Kigamboni, Ubungo and Ilala (downtown Dar es Salaam). To the east is the Indian Ocean, to the north and west the Pwani Region of Tanzania.

The 2002 Tanzanian National Census showed that the population of Kinondoni was 1,083,913. The census of 2012 showed that the population of Kinondoni was 1,775,049: 914,247 female and 860,802 male. There are 446,504 households in Kinondoni with an average of 4 people per household. Kinondoni has 20 wards. One ward share the same name as Kinondoni. 

The original inhabitants of Kinondoni were the Zaramo and Ndengereko, but due to urbanization the district has become multi-ethnic.

Wards 
Below is a list of the wards in Kinondoni District:

 Bunju
 Goba
 Hananasif
 Kawe
 Kibamba
 Kigogo
 Kijitonyama
 Kimara
 Kinondoni
 Kunduchi
 Magomeni
 Makumbusho
 Makurumla
 Mbezi
 Mbweni
  Mikocheni
 Msasani
 Mwananyamala
 Mzimuni
 Ndugumbi
 Tandale
 Mbezi Juu
 Makongo
 Mabwepande
 Wazi

Sources
 Kinondoni District homepage for the 2002 Tanzania National Census
 Kinondoni Municipal Council

References

 
Dar es Salaam
Districts of Dar es Salaam Region
Populated places in Dar es Salaam Region